The 2011 Carolina RailHawks FC season was the fifth season of existence for the Carolina RailHawks FC. It was their fifth-consecutive year in the second flight of American soccer, as well as their inaugural season in the new North American Soccer League.

Match results

Preseason

Regular season

Playoffs

Club

Roster 
As of May 11, 2011

Team Management 
  Martin Rennie - Head Coach
  Paul Ritchie - Assistant Coach
  Dewan Bader - Assistant Coach
  Nenad Žigante - Goalkeeper Coach
  Andy Dunbar - Equipment Manager
  Lizy Coleman - Head Trainer
  Paul Coleman - Massage Therapist

Standings 
Carolina RailHawks' first season in the North American Soccer League began on April 9 and will end on September 24. The team presently stands in first place in the single league table.

Transfers

In

Out

References

North Carolina FC seasons
Carolina RailHawks FC
C
Carolina RailHawks